John Douglas Wright (29 April 1917 – 28 December 1992) was an English professional footballer who played as a left half in the Football League for Southend United, Newcastle United and Lincoln City, where he won the Football League Third Division North  title in 1951–52 and became player-coach before returning north to manage Blyth Spartans. While with Newcastle (where he played two full seasons in the Football League Second Division either side of World War II), he also made one appearance for the England national team in a 4–0 victory over Norway in 1938, aged 21 with the match played at his home ground St James' Park. His career was jeopardised by a leg injury sustained at the Battle of Dunkirk during the war but he was able to make a recovery.

His father, Scotsman Jocky Wright, was also a footballer who played for several clubs across Britain before settling in Southend-on-Sea; his brother Billy Wright (17 years older and born in Sheffield during an earlier stage of their father's career) played for Bolton Wanderers and Reading.

References

1917 births
1992 deaths
People from Rochford
Sportspeople from Essex
English people of Scottish descent
British Army personnel of World War II
Association football wing halves
Association football coaches
English footballers
England international footballers
Chelmsford City F.C. players
Southend United F.C. players
Newcastle United F.C. players
Lincoln City F.C. players
Hamilton Academical F.C. wartime guest players
Blyth Spartans A.F.C. players
English Football League players
English football managers
Blyth Spartans A.F.C. managers
Black Watch soldiers
Southend United F.C. wartime guest players
Swansea Town A.F.C. wartime guest players